An airport authority is an independent entity charged with the operation and oversight of an airport or group of airports. These authorities are often governed by a group of airport commissioners, who are appointed to lead the authority by a government official. When the authority of an entity encompasses more than just the airports in an area, harbor and rail facilities for example, the entity may be referred to as a port authority.

The Airports Council International is the world trade association of airport authorities.

In Canada, airport authorities usually refer to private (not government owned or affiliated) not-for-profit companies that are established to manage a city's commercial airports.

Examples of airport authorities overseeing multiple airports
 Canada
 Edmonton Airports
 Edmonton International Airport
Edmonton/Villeneuve Airport
 France
 Aéroports de Paris
 Manages 14 airports near Paris
 Spain
 AENA
 Manages 46 airports and 2 heliports in Spain
 Hong Kong
 Airport Authority Hong Kong
 Hong Kong International Airport
 Hangzhou Xiaoshan International Airport
 Zhuhai Sanzao Airport
 India
 Airports Authority of India
 Manages all airports in India, including:
 12 international airports
 89 domestic airports
 26 enclave airports
 Indonesia
 Angkasa Pura I
 Manages 16 airports in central and eastern parts of Java and most of Bali (except Purbalingga, Malang, Jember and Banyuwangi), eastern and southern Kalimantan (except Samarinda and Tarakan), Batam, Lesser Sunda Islands (except Labuan Bajo), northern and southern Sulawesi, Maluku and Papua
 Angkasa Pura II
 Manages 20 airports in Sumatra (except Batam), Jakarta, West Java, Banten, Purbalingga and Banyuwangi regencies and western and central Kalimantan
 Japan
 Kansai Airports
Kansai International Airport
Itami Airport
Kobe Airport
 Malaysia
 Malaysia Airports
 Manages 39 airports in Malaysia and 1 international airport in Turkey
 Thailand
 Airports of Thailand
Suvarnabhumi Airport (International)
Don Mueang International Airport
Phuket International Airport
Chiang Mai International Airport
Hat Yai International Airport
Mae Fah Luang International Airport
 United Arab Emirates
Dubai Airports Company
Dubai International Airport
Al Maktoum International Airport
 United States
 Columbus Regional Airport Authority
 John Glenn Columbus International Airport
 Rickenbacker International Airport
 Bolton Field
 Jacksonville Aviation Authority
Jacksonville International Airport
Craig Municipal Airport
Herlong Airport
Cecil Field
 Greater Orlando Aviation Authority
 Orlando International Airport
 Orlando Executive Airport
Allegheny County Airport Authority (ACAA)
Pittsburgh International Airport
Allegheny County Airport
 Indianapolis Airport Authority
 Eagle Creek Airpark
 Indianapolis International Airport  
 Indianapolis Metropolitan Airport
 Indianapolis Regional (Mount Comfort) Airport
 Massachusetts Port Authority (Massport)
Boston Logan International Airport
L.G. Hanscom Field
Worcester Regional Airport
Metropolitan Airports Commission - Minneapolis-Saint Paul
Minneapolis-Saint Paul International Airport
Airlake Airport
St. Paul Downtown Airport
Anoka County-Blaine Airport
Crystal Airport
Flying Cloud Airport
Lake Elmo Airport 
Metropolitan Nashville Airport Authority (MNAA)
Nashville International Airport
John C. Tune Airport
 Metropolitan Washington Airports Authority (MWAA)
 Washington Reagan National Airport
 Washington Dulles International Airport
Omaha Airport Authority
Omaha Eppley Airfield
Millard Airport
 Port Authority of New York and New Jersey
 John F. Kennedy International Airport
 LaGuardia Airport
 Newark Liberty International Airport
 Stewart International Airport
 Teterboro Airport
 Wayne County Airport Authority
  Detroit Metropolitan Wayne County Airport
  Willow Run Airport